Adams Academy was a school that opened in 1872 in Quincy, Massachusetts, United States. John Adams, the second President of the United States, had many years before established the Adams Temple and School Fund. This fund gave  of land to the people of Quincy in trust. His objective for the money was to build a school in honor of his friends John Hancock and Josiah Quincy, who, like Adams, lived in the town of Quincy, Massachusetts. John Hancock's birth place had been on the land.

Origins
John Adams, the second President of the United States, was a lifelong resident of Quincy, Massachusetts. In 1822, when he was in his eighties, he made several bequests to the town of Quincy. One gave to the town land and funding for the construction of the First Parish Church, one concerned the disposition of part of his personal library, and the third was for the establishment of a local school. Adams established the Adams Temple and School Fund to manage these properties.

Although the church was constructed first (per Adams' instructions) in 1828, the school took some time to develop, owing to its small endowment.  By 1868 the endowment had grown large enough to begin work on the school, and Adams' grandson Charles Francis Adams, Sr., a supervisor of the Fund, invited architect Henry Van Brunt to design a suitable building.  The Fund board approved Brunt's plans (made in collaboration with William Robert Ware) in January 1870, and the building was completed that year at a cost of $29,000.

History of the academy
Adams Academy opened its doors in 1872, and operated until 1908; its peak enrollment was 140 students in 1876–77. The school was modeled after its football rivals, Phillips Academy and Phillips Exeter Academy. There was a strong emphasis placed on the classics, and Adams students were prepared to attend Harvard. By the early twentieth century, however, public schools in the area had improved, and there was competition from other private academies. Due to lack on enrollment, Adams Academy was closed in 1908.

Later uses of the building
After the Academy closed, the Adams Temple and School Fund sought other uses for the building that were in keeping with John Adams' original bequest.  For a number of years it was used by a variety of civic organizations, including the Boy Scouts, American Legion, and the Red Cross. In the 1950s and ’60s, it was the home of the local military draft board. 

Although it was first proposed in 1934, only in 1972 was the building leased to the Quincy Historical Society, which is now its tenant.  The Society uses the building as a museum and to house its library, uses deemed by the Fund trustees (who include Adams descendants) to be in keeping with John Adams' original intentions.

Adams Academy today
The building was listed on the National Register of Historic Places in 1974, and designated a National Historic Landmark in 1994. It is located at 8 Adams Street.

See also
List of National Historic Landmarks in Massachusetts
National Register of Historic Places listings in Quincy, Massachusetts

Gallery

References

External links
 Quincy Historical Society - Adams Academy

Educational institutions established in 1872
National Historic Landmarks in Massachusetts
School buildings completed in 1869
Buildings and structures in Quincy, Massachusetts
Schools in Norfolk County, Massachusetts
Defunct schools in Massachusetts
School buildings on the National Register of Historic Places in Massachusetts
1872 establishments in Massachusetts
National Register of Historic Places in Quincy, Massachusetts